Brian McKeever (born June 18, 1979) is a Canadian cross-country skier and biathlete, who became Canada's most decorated Winter Paralympian when he won his 14th medal at the 2018 Winter Paralympics. He finished the 2018 Games with a career total of 13 gold medals and 17 medals, making him the most decorated Paralympic cross-country skier ever. McKeever claimed a 16th Paralympic gold medal in the men's para cross-country middle distance vision impaired race at Beijing 2022, drawing him level with the German para-alpine racer Gerd Schönfelder for the most men's Winter Paralympic wins.

Biography
McKeever began skiing at the age of three and started competing at thirteen. At 19 he began losing his vision due to Stargardt's disease. At the 2002 and 2006 Winter Paralympics he competed in both cross-country skiing and biathlon. He won two gold medals and a silver in cross-country the first year and bronze medal for biathlon plus two gold medals and a silver for cross-country skiing in the later year. For his performance at the 2006 Games McKeever was named Best Male at the Paralympic Sport Awards.

McKeever's older brother, Robin McKeever, competed as his guide in the Paralympics until 2014, when Erik Carleton took over.

In 2010, he became the first Canadian athlete to be named to both Paralympic and Olympic teams.  At the 2010 Winter Olympics, he was going to compete in the men's 50km cross-country race, however Canada's coach decided to replace him with a skier who did well at an earlier event at the 2010 games and thus he did not become the first athlete in the world to compete in the Winter Paralympics and Winter Olympics in the same year.

At the 2010 Paralympics McKeever won three gold medals for cross-country skiing.

McKeever repeated this triple gold medal performance at the 2014 Winter Paralympics in Sochi, sweeping the men's visually impaired cross country skiing individual events for the second time.

At the 2018 Winter Paralympics in Pyeongchang, McKeever was Canada's flagbearer during the opening ceremonies. His gold medal in the men's 20-kilometre cross-country ski freestyle event was the 14th of his career, to pass Lana Spreeman as Canada's most decorated Winter Paralympian. McKeever won another two individual gold and a team relay bronze, his third triple gold medal sweep, for a career total of 13 gold medals and 17 medals in all, making him also the most decorated Paralympic cross-country skier ever.

Prior to the 2022 Winter Paralympics in Beijing, McKeever announced that he would retire after the Games. He swept his three individual events for the fourth Paralympics in a row, including the men's visually impaired 20 kilometre classical, 1.5 kilometre sprint, and 12.5 kilometre freestyle—his 16th Paralympic medal and 20th overall.

Awards and honours
In 2011, McKeever was inducted alongside his brother Robin into the Canadian Disability Hall of Fame.

References

External links 
 
 
 

1979 births
Biathletes at the 2002 Winter Paralympics
Biathletes at the 2006 Winter Paralympics
Biathletes at the 2010 Winter Paralympics
Biathletes at the 2014 Winter Paralympics
Canadian blind people
Canadian male biathletes
Canadian male cross-country skiers
Cross-country skiers at the 2002 Winter Paralympics
Cross-country skiers at the 2006 Winter Paralympics
Cross-country skiers at the 2010 Winter Paralympics
Cross-country skiers at the 2014 Winter Paralympics
Cross-country skiers at the 2018 Winter Paralympics
Cross-country skiers at the 2022 Winter Paralympics
Living people
Paralympic biathletes of Canada
Paralympic cross-country skiers of Canada
Paralympic gold medalists for Canada
Paralympic silver medalists for Canada
Paralympic bronze medalists for Canada
Visually impaired category Paralympic competitors
Medalists at the 2006 Winter Paralympics
Medalists at the 2002 Winter Paralympics
Medalists at the 2010 Winter Paralympics
Medalists at the 2014 Winter Paralympics
Medalists at the 2018 Winter Paralympics
Medalists at the 2022 Winter Paralympics
Canadian Disability Hall of Fame
Paralympic Sport Awards — Best Male winners
Paralympic medalists in cross-country skiing
Paralympic medalists in biathlon
Skiers from Calgary